Peter Peak is an 850 m knob in Delchev Ridge, Tangra Mountains, eastern Livingston Island in the South Shetland Islands, Antarctica.  The peak surmounts Iskar Glacier to the west, Bruix Cove to the northwest and Sopot Ice Piedmont to the north and east.

The peak is named after Czar Peter II (IV) of Bulgaria, 1185 - 1197 AD, who together with his brother Czar Asen I restored Bulgaria's independence to establish the Second Bulgarian Kingdom.

Location

Maps
 L.L. Ivanov et al. Antarctica: Livingston Island and Greenwich Island, South Shetland Islands. Scale 1:100000 topographic map. Sofia: Antarctic Place-names Commission of Bulgaria, 2005.
 L.L. Ivanov. Antarctica: Livingston Island and Greenwich, Robert, Snow and Smith Islands. Scale 1:120000 topographic map.  Troyan: Manfred Wörner Foundation, 2009.

Notes

References
 Bulgarian Antarctic Gazetteer. Antarctic Place-names Commission. (details in Bulgarian, basic data in English)

External links
 Peter Peak. Copernix satellite image

Tangra Mountains